The R870 or Barishal-Pirojpur Highway is a transportation artery in Bangladesh, which connects National Highway N8 (at Barishal City) with Regional Highway R770 (at Pirojpur).

See also 

 N8 (Bangladesh)

References 

Regional Highways in Bangladesh